The 2000 Major League Soccer SuperDraft was held on February 6, 2000 in Fort Lauderdale, Florida, and consisted of six rounds.

One of the most successful draft picks was goalkeeper Nick Rimando, a third round pick, who went on to hold the record for most MLS career shutouts. Additionally, first round pick defender Carlos Bocanegra earned over 100 caps with the United States men's national soccer team.

Player selection
Any player whose name is marked with an * was contracted under the Project-40 program.

Round 1

Round 1 trades

Round 2

Round 2 trades

Round 3

Round 3 trades

Round 4

Round 4 trades

Round 5

Round 5 trades

Round 6

Round 6 trades

Unresolved 2000 SuperDraft Trades
21 January 1999: MetroStars traded F Raúl Díaz Arce and MF Marcelo Vega to San Jose for a player to be named and future considerations.
29 March 1997: Kansas City Wizards acquired D John Diffley from the Tampa Bay Mutiny for a conditional third-round draft pick in 1999 or 2000.
28 January 1999: D.C. United traded second round and third round picks in 2000 college draft to New York/New Jersey MetroStars for Diego Sonora.
28 January 1999: San Jose sent third-rounder to MetroStars in Diego Sonora three-way deal.
7 February 1999: New England Revolution acquired two second round selections in the 2000 MLS College Draft from the New York/New Jersey MetroStars in exchange for a second round selection in the 1999 MLS College Draft.
7 February 1999: MetroStars acquired D.C.'s first-round 1999 supplemental draft pick for its 2000 first-round supplemental draft pick (4th round SuperDraft).
5 May 1999: Chicago acquired Ryan Tinsley via trade with Kansas City Wizards in exchange for Jesse Van Saun and Fire's No. 1 selection in the 2000 MLS Supplemental Draft (4th round SuperDraft). -Chi2011
5 June 1999: Miami Fusion acquired a 2000 second-round pick and forward Tony Kuhn from New England Revolution in exchange for midfielder Carlos Parra.

References 

Major League Soccer drafts
SuperDraft
MLS SuperDraft
Soccer in Florida
Sports in Fort Lauderdale, Florida
Events in Fort Lauderdale, Florida
MLS SuperDraft